Face to Face was a BBC interview television programme originally broadcast between 1959 and 1962, created and produced by Hugh Burnett, which ran for 35 episodes. The insightful and often probing style of the interviewer, former politician John Freeman, separated it from other programmes of the time. Face to Face was revived in 1989 with Jeremy Isaacs as the interviewer and ran until 1998.

History

BBC talks producer Hugh Burnett had the idea of a simple personal interview programme in the mid-1950s. It took two years to persuade Grace Wyndham Goldie (assistant head of talks television) to commission a programme. Burnett decided on John Freeman as the interviewer "because he was highly skilled at probing closely without causing offence"; he asked Freeman while walking around the BBC block at Lime Grove Studios, and Freeman agreed by the second lap. Freeman had been a reporter on BBC TV's Panorama since 1957, and had also appeared as an interviewer on Press Conference.

The first Face to Face programme featured Lord Birkett, an advocate and a judge who had been involved in the Nuremberg trials; it had an audience of four million and a 'reaction index' (approval rating) of 83%. Face to Face episodes then appeared, irregularly, through 1959. The programme's best-remembered guests are Tony Hancock and Gilbert Harding, both of whom seemed disturbed by the questioning, but both of whom later endorsed Freeman's interview style. Harding wept as he recalled his relationship with his mother, while the programme with Hancock is considered to have been a contributing factor in his ultimate self-destruction because it is assumed to have enhanced his inclination to be self-critical. On one occasion an interviewee attempted rather underhand tactics to succeed in enduring his ordeal. The novelist Evelyn Waugh wrote to a mutual friend of Freeman and himself, the Labour politician Tom Driberg, asking for information to disarm his interlocutor during the proceedings.

Some potential guests whom Hugh Burnett wanted for the programme did not appear. His desire for the former-fascist leader Oswald Mosley to be "given a going over" by John Freeman was referred up to BBC Director General Hugh Greene who rejected the idea, fearing race riots would occur. An elusive Marlene Dietrich was finally tracked down to Paris but hung up after saying "you can't afford me". Shipping magnate Aristotle Onassis wanted advance knowledge of the questions which was refused.

John Freeman outlived all his subjects except for Albert Finney and Sir Stirling Moss.

Format

Freeman's face was almost never shown. Apart from showing the back of his head, the cameras were concentrated on the subject, sometimes concentrating on a nervously smoked cigarette or a close-up of a face. The theme music was an excerpt from the overture to Berlioz' uncompleted opera Les francs-juges. The titles for each episode featured caricatures of that week's subject drawn by Feliks Topolski. Some episodes departed from an interview conducted at the BBC's Lime Grove Studios: the edition with Carl Gustav Jung was conducted at his home in Switzerland and Compton Mackenzie was in bed for his.

Revival

Revived in 1989 with Jeremy Isaacs as its host, the questioner attempted to mimic the style of his predecessor with a similar interview technique. However, most of this later programme's subjects were more familiar with the medium than the earlier guests, so it was quite difficult to catch them off-guard. Some of these interviews were featured as part of the arts programme The Late Show. Running until 1998, the revival actually had a longer overall run than the original.

Isaacs himself was an interviewee in the revived series, facing James Naughtie.

The programme was again revived by ITV Wales in 2011, presented by its Political Editor, Adrian Masters. The programme had exactly the same format as the BBC version, but the purpose of the first series was to interview the leaders of the four main political parties in the lead-up to the 2011 Assembly elections. Carwyn Jones, Nick Bourne, Ieuan Wyn Jones and Kirsty Williams were all interviewed. Further editions were broadcast in 2012, in a non-election context, the first of which featured Peter Hain.

The Sky Arts programme In Confidence, originally broadcast in 2010 and presented by Laurie Taylor, features an identical format.

Reshowing of episodes 

Episodes of the original Face to Face were shown frequently on BBC Knowledge and still turn up occasionally on its successor BBC Four, especially during seasons such as The Lost Decade in October 2005. 30 of the original 35 episodes have been repeated, the exceptions being Nubar Gulbenkian, Roy Welensky, General Von Senger, Victor Gollancz and Danny Blanchflower. The soundtrack of the interview with Stirling Moss was issued on the 'B' side of an LP which also featured the soundtrack of the interview with Hancock. The BBC issued the original programme in a Region 2 DVD boxset in September 2009, complete apart from the interview with Albert Finney. The BBC has put up an online archive of selected programmes.

List of subjects

Original programme (1959–1962)

Revival (1989–1998)

References

Further reading 
 A book of the same name was published in 1964 with the portraits by Felix Topolski. (Jonathan Cape, London, 1964; Stein & Day, New York, 1965.)
 A further anthology appeared in 1989 and was published by BBC Books. Introduced by Joan Bakewell, and tied in with a (terrestrial) screening of selected episodes, it includes transcripts of the programmes with Bertrand Russell, Henry Moore, Stirling Moss, Gilbert Harding, Adam Faith and Albert Finney; the Hancock interview was excluded.

BBC Television shows
Black-and-white British television shows
1959 British television series debuts
1962 British television series endings